Croatia competed at the 2014 Winter Paralympics in Sochi, Russia, held between 7–16 March 2014.

Alpine skiing

Men

See also
Croatia at the Paralympics
Croatia at the 2014 Winter Olympics

References

Nations at the 2014 Winter Paralympics
2014
Winter Paralympics